Piața Unirii (Unification Square or Union Square in English) is one of the largest squares in central Bucharest, Romania, located in the center of the city where Sectors 1, 2, 3, and 4 meet. Part of the Civic Centre, it is bisected by Unirii Boulevard, originally built during the Communist era as the Boulevard of the Victory of Socialism, and renamed after the Romanian Revolution.

The square is a significant transport hub, containing the Piața Unirii metro station and a major interchange for STB buses; there is also a tram terminal near the southwest corner. The Unirea Shopping Center, the Cocor department store and a large taxi rank are located on the east side of this square, while Hanul lui Manuc is on the north side, near the northeast corner. There were plans to build the Romanian National Salvation Cathedral on the place of this park, but the idea proved technically impossible due to the busy underground environment and lack of popularity among local citizens and therefore the location was changed.

In 2023, an expertise carried out by civil engineers revealed severe degradation to the cover of the Dâmbovița river at Piața Unirii. The cover, which was part of a larger, unrealized project between 1938 and 1941 was found to be in a state of advanced degradation with exposed rebar and crumbling concrete. Following these revelations, traffic of over 3,5 tonnes is banned from travelling through the square.

The square features a large Christmas tree erected every December.

See also
Centrul Civic

Gallery

References

Unirii
Historic monuments in Bucharest